Eupromera spryana is a species of beetle in the family Cerambycidae. It was described by Westwood in 1846. It is known from Brazil.

References

Eupromerini
Beetles described in 1846